08/15 is a 1954–55 West German film trilogy directed by Paul May and based on the novel 08/15 by Hans Hellmut Kirst who also served as the film's screenwriter (published in English as "The Revolt of Gunner Asch"). The term 08/15 (nill-eight/fifteen) refers to the German Army's standard machine gun, the 08/15 (or MG 08 model 15), by far, the most common German machine gun deployed in World War I. It was manufactured in such large quantities that it became the German Army slang for anything that was standard issue.

The film follows the story of Private Asch, a German soldier in World War II. The film title implies that Asch, and the soldiers under his command, were unostentatious (i.e. "run-of-the-mill") characters deployed on the Eastern Front.

Premise
The last of the 08/15 film trilogy ends with Germany being occupied by American soldiers who are portrayed as bubble-gum chewing, slack-jawed, uncultured louts, inferior in every respect to the heroic German soldiers. The only exception is the Jewish emigrant, now a US officer, who is shown as both intelligent and unscrupulous, the fact interpreted by Professor Omer Bartov as implying that the "real tragedy of World War II was that the Nazis did not get a chance to exterminate all Semites, who have now returned with Germany's defeat to once more exploit the German people". "Although Asch is never identified with the Americans – indeed, in the final film of the trilogy, the Americans appear to be nearly as dangerous a foe as the SS."

Parts
 Part 1: In der Kaserne (In the Barracks)
 Part 2: Im Krieg (In War)

Cast
Joachim Fuchsberger as Private I Class / Staff Sergeant / Lieutenant Asch
Helen Vita as Lore Schulz
 Peter Carsten as Corporal Kowalski

Notes

References

External links

Film series introduced in 1954
1950s German-language films
West German films
German World War II films
German film series
Films based on German novels
Films based on military novels
Films directed by Paul May
Film series based on novels
Films with screenplays by Ernst von Salomon
1950s German films